The pair skating event was held as part of the figure skating at the 1924 Winter Olympics. It was the third appearance of the event, which had previously been held at the Summer Olympics in 1908 and 1920. The competition was held on Thursday, 31 January 1924. Eighteen figure skaters, from seven nations, competed.

Results

Referee:
  Charles M. Rotch

Judges:
  Ernst Herz
  Herbert Yglesias
  J.G. Künzli
  Francis Pigueron
  Josef Fellner
  Louis Magnus
  Edourd Delpy

References

External links
 Official Official Olympic Report
 sports-reference
 

Figure skating at the 1924 Winter Olympics
1924 in figure skating
1924
Mixed events at the 1924 Winter Olympics